Alexander Ivanovich Kazakov (born 24 May 1948, Moscow) is a Russian politician and economist who held a number of senior government posts during the presidency of Boris Yeltsin, including deputy chief of the presidential administration and Deputy Prime Minister. He was among the officials in charge of overseeing the privatization of the Russian economy in the 1990s, being the head of the State Property Committee. Kazakov was also an associate of Anatoly Chubais.

Biography
Under the Soviet Union, Kazakov worked in Gosplan, the economic planning agency of the USSR, until 1992. During his service in the Russian government, Kazakov was deputy chairman of the property commission under Anatoly Chubais in 1993–1994 before becoming part of President Boris Yeltsin's administration as the head of the department working with regional bureaucracies. In January 1996, President Yeltsin appointed Kazakov to the post of chairman of the State Property Committee and also one of the Deputy Chairmen of Government of the Russian Federation. In his new position, Kazakov was largely carrying out the policies favored by Chubais, being expected to continue them rather than make major changes.

He also worked as an official at Gazprom during the 1990s.

Sources

References

Books
 

1948 births
1st class Active State Councillors of the Russian Federation
20th-century Russian politicians
Deputy heads of government of the Russian Federation
Gazprom people
Living people
Members of the Federation Council of Russia (after 2000)
Economists from Moscow
Businesspeople  from Moscow